The 2012 South Lakeland District Council election was held on 3 May 2012 to elect members of South Lakeland District Council in Cumbria, England. One third of the council was up for election, having been elected "all out" in 2008 and "in thirds" every year thereafter.

Election results summary

Ward results

The Conservative Party had previously gained the seat in Lyth Valley at a by-election.

By-Elections

See also
 South Lakeland local elections

References

2012
2012 English local elections
2010s in Cumbria